Dear Archimedes (Chinese: 亲爱的阿基米德; lit. My Dear Achimedes) is a South Korean-Chinese web drama starring Oh Se-hun and Xu Ling Yue. The drama is based on a Chinese novel of the same name.

Plot 
The story of a genius logician, Yan Su (Oh Se-hun), who lives in a mysterious castle, isolated from the outside world. He works to solve inscrutable and complicated cases. One day, Zhen Ai (Xu Ling Yue), a clever biologist, walks into his castle to help him in solving a cryptic code.

Cast 
 Oh Se-hun as Yan Su
 Xu Ling Yue as Zhen Ai
 Yang Ye Ming
 Wang Zi Xuan

Production
 Filming started on September 14, 2016 and took place in South Korea.

References

South Korean web series
Chinese web series